Mandooka Parinaya is a Hindu wedding ceremony of two frogs, which is performed in the belief that the marriage will appease the Hindu rain-god Indra, who will then increase in rains in the area.

References

Hindu rituals